Coaxial rotors or coax rotors are a pair of helicopter rotors mounted one above the other on concentric shafts, with the same axis of rotation, but turning in opposite directions (contra-rotating). This rotor configuration is a feature of helicopters produced by the Russian Kamov helicopter design bureau.

History 

The idea of coaxial rotors originates with Mikhail Lomonosov. He had developed a small helicopter model with coaxial rotors in July 1754 and demonstrated it to the Russian Academy of Sciences.

In 1859, the British Patent Office awarded the first helicopter patent to Henry Bright for his coaxial design. From this point, coaxial helicopters developed into fully operational machines as we know them today.

Two pioneering helicopters, the Corradino D'Ascanio-built "D'AT3" of 1930, and the generally more successful French mid-1930s Gyroplane Laboratoire, both used coaxial rotor systems for flight.

Design considerations 

Having two coaxial sets of rotors provides symmetry of forces around the central axis for lifting the vehicle and laterally when flying in any direction. Because of the mechanical complexity, many helicopter designs use alternate configurations to avoid problems that arise when only one main rotor is used. Common alternatives are single-rotor helicopters or tandem rotor arrangements.

Torque 

One of the problems with any single set of rotor blades is the torque (rotational force) exerted on the helicopter fuselage in the direction opposite to the rotor blades. This torque causes the fuselage to rotate in the direction opposite to the rotor blades. In single rotor helicopters, the antitorque rotor or tail rotor counteracts the main rotor torque and controls the fuselage rotation.

Coaxial rotors solve the problem of main rotor torque by turning each set of rotors in opposite directions. The opposite torques from the rotors cancel each other out. Rotational maneuvering, yaw control, is accomplished by increasing the collective pitch of one rotor and decreasing the collective pitch on the other. This causes a controlled dissymmetry of torque.

Dissymmetry of lift 

Dissymmetry of lift is an aerodynamic phenomenon caused by the rotation of a helicopter's rotors in forward flight. Rotor blades provide lift proportional to the amount of air flowing over them. When viewed from above, the rotor blades move in the direction of flight for half of the rotation (advancing half), and then move in the opposite direction for the remainder of the rotation (retreating half). A rotor blade produces more lift in the advancing half. As a blade moves toward the direction of flight, the forward motion of the aircraft increases the speed of the air flowing around the blade until it reaches a maximum when the blade is perpendicular to the relative wind. At the same time, a rotor blade in the retreating half produces less lift. As a blade moves away from the direction of flight, the speed of the airflow over the rotor blade is reduced by an amount equal to the forward speed of the aircraft, reaching its maximum effect when the rotor blade is again perpendicular to the relative wind. 
Coaxial rotors avoid the effects of dissymmetry of lift through the use of two rotors turning in opposite directions, causing blades to advance on either side at the same time.

Other benefits 
Another benefit arising from a coaxial design includes increased payload for the same engine power; a tail rotor typically wastes some of the available engine power that would be fully devoted to lift and thrust with a coaxial design. Reduced noise is the main advantage of the configuration; some of the loud "spanking" sound associated with conventional helicopters arises from interaction between the airflows from the main and tail rotors, which in some designs can be severe. Also, helicopters using coaxial rotors tend to be more compact (with a smaller footprint on the ground), though at the price of increased height, and consequently have uses in areas where space is at a premium; several Kamov designs are used in naval roles, being capable of operating from confined spaces on the decks of ships, including ships other than aircraft carriers (an example being the Kara-class cruisers of the Russian navy, which carry a Ka-25 'Hormone' helicopter as part of their standard equipment). Another benefit is increased safety on the ground; the absence of a tail rotor eliminates the major source of injuries and fatalities to ground crews and bystanders.

Disadvantages 
There is an increased mechanical complexity of the rotor hub. The linkages and swashplates for two rotor systems need to be assembled atop the mast, which is more complex because of the need to drive two rotors in opposite directions. Because of the greater number of moving parts and complexity, the coaxial rotor system is more prone to mechanical faults and possible failure. Coaxial helicopters are also more prone to the "whipping" of blades and blade self-collision, according to critics.

Coaxial models 

The system's inherent stability and quick control response make it suitable for use in small radio-controlled helicopters. These benefits come at the cost of a limited forward speed, and higher sensitivity to wind. These two factors are especially limiting in outdoor use. Such models are usually fixed-pitch (i.e., the blades cannot be rotated on their axes for different angles of attack), simplifying the model but eliminating the ability to compensate with collective input. Compensating for even the slightest breeze causes the model to climb rather than to fly forward even with full application of cyclic.

Coaxial multirotors 

Multirotor type unmanned aerial vehicles exist in numerous configurations including duocopter, tricopter, quadcopter, hexacopter and octocopter. All of them can be upgraded to coaxial configuration in order to bring more stability and flight time while allowing carrying much more payload without gaining too much weight. Indeed, coaxial multirotors are made by having each arm carrying two motors facing in opposite directions (one up and one down). Therefore, it is possible to have an octorotor looking like a quadcopter thanks to coaxial configuration. Special Duocopters are characterised by two motors aligned in a vertical axis. The control is performed by the appropriate acceleration of a single rotor blade for targeted thrust generation during revolution. Having more lifting power for a greater payload explains why coaxial multirotors are preferred for all professional commercial application of UAS.

Reduced hazards of flight 

The U.S. Department of Transportation has published a “Basic Helicopter Handbook”.  One of the chapters in it is titled, “Some Hazards of Helicopter Flight'. Ten hazards have been listed to indicate what a typical single rotor helicopter has to deal with. The coaxial rotor design either reduces or completely eliminates many of these hazards. The following list indicates which:

 Settling with power — Reduced
 Retreating blade stall  — Reduced
 Medium frequency vibrations — Reduced
 High frequency vibrations — None
 Anti torque system failure in forward flight — Eliminated
 Anti torque system failure while hovering — Eliminated

The reduction and elimination of these hazards are the strong points for the safety of coaxial rotor design.

List of coaxial rotor helicopters 

 Bendix Model K (1945)
 Brantly B-1 (1946)
 Bendix Model J (1946)
 Bréguet G.111 (1949)
 Bréguet-Dorand Gyroplane Laboratoire (1936)
 Cierva CR Twin (1969)
 Eagle's Perch (1998)
 EDM Aerotec CoAX 2D/2R
 Gyrodyne QH-50 DASH
 Hiller XH-44 (1944)
 Kamov Ka-10 (1949)
 Kamov Ka-15 (1953)
 Kamov Ka-18 (1955)
 Kamov Ka-25 (1963)
 Kamov Ka-26 (1965)
 Kamov Ka-27 (1974)
 Kamov Ka-50 (1982 and 1997 for Ka-52)
 Kamov Ka-92
 Kamov Ka-126 (1988) 
 Kamov Ka-226 (1997)
 Manzolini Libellula (1952)
 Phoenix Skyblazer (2011)
 Sikorsky S-69 (1973) 
 Sikorsky X2 (2008) 
 Sikorsky S-97
 Sikorsky/Boeing SB-1 Defiant
 Wagner Aerocar
 Mars helicopter Ingenuity (2021)

See also 
 Intermeshing rotors
 Contra-rotating propellers
 Tandem rotors
 Transverse rotors
 Mars helicopter Ingenuity

References

External links 

 Helicopter History Site

Aerodynamics
Coaxial rotor helicopters
Helicopter components
Rotorcraft